Peter Moore (1940–2010) was an Irish sportsperson. He played Gaelic football for his local club Ballinabrackey and was a senior member of the Meath county team from 1959 until 1970.

References

1940 births
2010 deaths
Bord na Móna people
Gaelic football managers
Meath inter-county Gaelic footballers